The Busitema Solar Power Station is a  solar power plant in Uganda.

Location

Overview
This solar station is a donation from the government of Egypt to the government of Uganda. This followed the signing of bilateral agreements between the two countries in 2016. This was then followed by the signing of a memorandum of understanding between Abdel Fattah el-Sisi, the president of Egypt, and Yoweri Museveni, the president of Uganda, in May 2018. The power station is intended to increase Uganda's renewable energy pool, increase the supply of power to the Eastern Region, and serve as a teaching tool to university students studying renewable energy programs.

This power station was be the fifth solar power station connected to the Ugandan national electricity power grid, after the Soroti Solar Power Station, which came online in December 2015, the Tororo Solar Power Station, which was commissioned in October 2017, and the Kabulasoke Solar Power Station, which was commissioned in December 2018. Mayuge Solar Power Station with capacity of 10 megawatts came online in June 2019.

Developers
The solar power plant was developed by engineers from the Egyptian Ministry of Electric & Renewable Energy Authority. The senior engineer is Mohammed A. Abdel Aziz and the project manager is engineer Reda Shaban Ali. An Egyptian team, led by the two, performed an advance inspection and approved the site of the plant.

The parties agreed for Egypt to provide the necessary equipment and engineering services while Uganda provides the  real estate where the plant is built. In addition, Uganda catered for the ground transportation and taxation of the donated equipment, from the port of Mombasa, Kenya to the project location in Uganda.

Commissioning
The completed power station was commissioned by the Energy Minister at that time, Ruth Nankabirwa and the First Deputy Prime Minister and Minister for the East African Community, Rebecca Kadaga, on 25 January 2022.

See also

List of power stations in Uganda
Electricity Regulatory Authority

References

External links
 Uganda Energy Situation In 2014
 Egypt, Uganda leaders discuss Nile water issue in Cairo As of 9 May 2018.

Solar power stations in Uganda
Eastern Region, Uganda
Energy infrastructure in Uganda
Energy infrastructure in Africa